The third season of Power Couple premiered on Tuesday, April 24, 2018 at 10:30 p.m. on RecordTV.

The show features eleven celebrity couples living under one roof and facing extreme challenges that will test how well they really know each other. Each week, a couple will be eliminated until the last couple wins the grand prize.

Gugu Liberato replaced Roberto Justus as the main host and production moved from São Paulo to Itapecerica da Serra (using the same House from A Fazenda 9: Nova Chance).

In February 2018, RecordTV  announced that various changes would occur with the format. For the first time, the show will air in real time and five times a week (Monday to Friday). At the end of each cycle, viewers at home will determine which one of the bottom two couples will continue in the game.

Tati Minerato & Marcelo Galatico won the competition with 60.98% of the public vote over Aritana Maroni & Paulo Rogério and took home the R$303.000 prize they accumulated during the show. Aritana & Paulo received R$122.800 (20% of their final jackpot) as the runners-up.

Cast

Couples

Future appearances

After this season, in 2018, Aloísio Chulapa (from Aloísio & Luisa) and Nadja Pessoa (from Vinícius & Nadja) appeared in A Fazenda 10. Chulapa finished in 12th place, while Nadja finished in 10th place after being ejected because of violent behaviour.

After this season, in 2018, Nizo Neto (from Nizo & Tatí) and Franciele Grossi (from Franciele & Diego) appeared in Dancing Brasil 4. Franciele finished in 13th place, while Nizo finished in 11th place.

In 2019, Vinícius D'Black (from Vinícius & Nadja) appeared in Dancing Brasil 5, he won the competition.

In 2019, Diego Grossi (from Franciele & Diego) appeared in A Fazenda 11, he finished in 3rd place in the competition.

In 2021, Nadja Pessoa (from Vinícius & Nadja) appeared in Ilha Record, she finished in 6th place in the competition.

In 2022, MC Créu (from Lilian & Créu) appeared in A Fazenda 14, he entered in the Warehouse where the public voted for one contestant to move into the main house, he didn't received enough votes to enter in the game.

The game
Key

Challenges' results

Notes

Special power
For the first 7 weeks, the Couple's challenge winners randomly picked two out of eight boxes from the Tree of Power of the following colors: blue, green, orange, pink, purple, red, white and yellow. Then, the couple would be given a choice between two advantages in the game; the couple's choice is marked in bold.
Results

Voting history

Notes

Ratings and reception

Brazilian ratings
All numbers are in points and provided by Kantar Ibope Media.

References

External links 
 Power Couple 3 on R7.com

2018 Brazilian television seasons
Power Couple (Brazilian TV series)